This article contains a list of notable Scottish royal mistresses.  The list cannot be complete since some earlier kings had illegitimate children by unknown mothers.

David II
 1360s: Agnes Dunbar

Robert II
 1330s: Elizabeth Mure

James IV
 1490s: Marion Boyd
 1490s: Margaret Drummond
 1497-1503: Janet Kennedy
 Isabel Stewart of Buchan

James V of Scotland
 1520s: Margaret Erskine, mother of James Stewart, 1st Earl of Moray
 1530s: Euphemia Elphinstone, mother of Robert Stewart, 1st Earl of Orkney
 1530s: Elizabeth Beaton/Bethune, mother of Lady Jean Stewart

James VI of Scotland
 1590s: Anne Lyon, Countess of Kinghorne

See also
List of English royal mistresses
List of Swedish royal mistresses

Scotland
Lists of Scottish people by occupation
Royal mistresses